William Layton "Fox" Stanton (May 20, 1874 – November 28, 1946) was an American football player and coach. He served as the head football coach at Pomona College from 1908 to 1915, at Occidental College in 1916 and again from 1918 to 1920, and at the California Institute of Technology (Caltech) from 1921 to 1941. Stanton also coached a United States Army team from Fort Lewis in the 1918 Rose Bowl.   died at the age of 72 on November 28, 1946 in Olympia, Washington.

Head coaching record

References

External links
 

1874 births
1946 deaths
19th-century players of American football
American football halfbacks
Caltech Beavers football coaches
Drexel Dragons football players
Occidental Tigers football coaches
Pomona-Pitzer Sagehens football coaches